Valvoja (Finnish: Observer) was a Finnish language literary and cultural magazine that existed between 1880 and 1924.

History and profile
Valvoja was launched in 1880 by a group of individuals who would become prominent academics and politicians, including Arvid Järnefelt and Ernst Gustaf Palmen. The magazine was significantly influenced from a Danish magazine, Tilskueren. The founding group adhered to the classical liberalism and supported the ideas of John Stuart Mill and Charles Darwin. However, the magazine editors did not endorse the naturalism.

Helmi Krohn and Thiodolf Rein served as the editors-in-chief of the magazine. Juhani Aho who was one of the early professional Finnish language authors, contributed to the öagazine. Another contributor was a member of Young Finns, Yrjo Koskelainen. Valvoja was instrumental in reintroducing the views of Anders Chydenius who was among the pioneers of the liberalism in Sweden and Finland. The magazine folded in 1924.

References

1880 establishments in the Russian Empire
1924 disestablishments in Finland
Cultural magazines
Defunct magazines published in Finland
Finnish-language magazines
Magazines established in 1880
Magazines disestablished in 1924